Syria (SYR) competed at the 2005 Mediterranean Games in Almería, Spain. The nation had a total number of 30 participants (28 men and 2 women).

Medals

Gold
 Boxing
Men's Featherweight (– 57 kg): Yaser Shigan

Silver
 Boxing
Men's Light Flyweight (– 48 kg): Amjad Aouda
Men's Bantamweight (– 54 kg): Mohamed Amiriek

 Weightlifting
Men's 105 kg (Clean&Jerk): Ahed Joughili

 Wrestling
Men's Freestyle (– 55 kg): Firas Rifaei
Men's Freestyle (– 66 kg): Mazen Kadmani

Bronze
 Athletics
Men's Javelin Throw: Feras Al-Mahamid

 Weightlifting
Men's 105 kg (Snatch): Ahed Joughili

 Wrestling
Men's Greco-Roman (– 60 kg): Zakaria Nashed
Men's Greco-Roman (– 66 kg): Yaser Salih
Men's Freestyle (– 120 kg): Akil Kahli

See also
 Syria at the 2004 Summer Olympics
 Syria at the 2008 Summer Olympics

References
 Official Site
 juegosmediterraneos

Nations at the 2005 Mediterranean Games
2005
Mediterranean Games